Bothwell Parish is the only Collegiate church where worship is still held. It is thought that the first Collegium of canons with its own chapel was formed in St. Andrews in the 13th century, and it is thought that by the Reformation there were more than 50 secular religious houses. The proscription of the Catholic faith in 1567 meant that these houses had to close.
Although Scotland endured the Iconoclasm of the Reformation, there are still some handsome structures extant. Some Collegiate churches were converted into local parish Kirks, whilst others have fallen to ruin, some a mixture of the two.

As a response to the power of medieval monastiscm, the rulers of Scotland—in common with many other Northern European states—tried to control the power of the church by encouraging local magnates to commission secular houses of worship within their lands and often within their own fortalices.

These churches were often considered as private fiefdoms within certain families as a means to ensure prayers for their souls and for the glory and immortality of their lines. Establishing previous monastic establishments as Collegia of Canons helped to "temporalise" authority over large areas of valuable land and increase the power of the crown.

Aberdeen
Saint Nicholas Collegiate Church

Ayrshire
Kilmaurs Collegiate Church
Maybole Collegiate Church

Dumfries & Galloway
Lincluden Collegiate Church

East Lothian

Dunbar Collegiate Church
Dunglass Collegiate Church, East Lothian
Seton Collegiate Church
St. Mary's Collegiate Church, Haddington
Yester Chapel/St. Cuthbert's Collegiate Church

Edinburgh
Corstorphine Collegiate Church
Restalrig Collegiate Church
St. Giles Collegiate Church, Edinburgh
Trinity Collegiate Church and Hospital, Edinburgh

Fife
Saint Salvator's Collegiate Chapel, St Andrews
Strathmiglo Collegiate Church

Glasgow
Glasgow Collegiate Church

Highland
Dornoch Collegiate Church
The Collegiate Church of St Duthac in Tain

Midlothian
Crichton Collegiate Church
Dalkeith Collegiate Church
Collegiate Chapel of St. Matthew, Roslin

Moray
Elgin Collegiate Church

Perth and Kinross
Abernethy Collegiate Church
Dunblane Collegiate Church
Innerpeffray Collegiate Church
Methven Collegiate Church

Scottish Borders
Peebles Collegiate Church

Stirling
Stirling Collegiate Church

West Dunbartonshire
St Mary's Collegiate Church, Dumbarton

To be sorted:
Semple Collegiate Church
Easter Fowlis Collegiate Church
Saint Nicholas Collegiate Church, Saint Andrews
Brechin Collegiate Church
Guthrie Collegiate Church
Dunkeld Collegiate Church
Fortrose Collegiate Church
Tain Collegiate Church
Lismore Collegiate Church
Kilmun Collegiate Church

 
Churches in Scotland
Collegiate churches